Droid or DROID may refer to: 

 A robot, or specifically android (robot)

Entertainment
 Droid (band), an American metal band
 Droid (film), a 1988 science fiction film
 Droid (Star Wars), science fictional machines from the Star Wars franchise
 Star Wars: Droids, a cartoon series from the Star Wars franchise
 Droids (role-playing game), a tabletop role-playing game
 Droid Bishop, American synthwave musician

Smartphones

 Droid, a common shorthand for Android (operating system)
 Verizon Droid, brand of smartphones

HTC
 Droid DNA
 Droid Eris
 Droid Incredible
 Droid Incredible 2
 Droid Incredible 4G LTE

Motorola
 Motorola Droid
 Droid 2
 Droid 3
 Droid 4
 Droid Bionic
 Droid Pro
 Droid X
 Droid X2
 Droid Razr
 Droid Razr HD
 Droid Maxx
 Droid Ultra
 Droid Mini
 Droid Turbo

Samsung
 Droid Charge

Other uses
 DROID (Digital Record Object IDentification), a software tool for the PRONOM technical registry of the UK government's National Archives
 DroID, a biological database
 Droid fonts, a family of typefaces for the Android operating system
 Droid (album)

See also
 Android (disambiguation)
 Gynoid